"Sweet Lady Genevieve" is the third track from The Kinks' 1973 rock opera Preservation Act 1. It was written by Ray Davies.

Lyrics

"Sweet Lady Genevieve" is part of the rock opera, Preservation Act 1, with the lyrics being sung by Davies as the "Tramp", one of the principal figures in the story line. In the track, the Tramp is begging for the forgiveness of his former lover, Genevieve, saying that "this time I'll give you some security and I won’t make promises I can’t keep". Author Andrew Hickey said in his book, Preservation: The Kinks' Music 1964-1974, that the track was "Ray Davies' attempt to reach out to his estranged wife Rasa."  The Tramp returns later in the album on "Sitting in the Midday Sun".

Release

The track was released as a single in the U.K. (but not in the America, where it was used as the B-side to "Sitting in the Midday Sun") with "Sitting in My Hotel", (from the previous album, Everybody's in Show-Biz)
as the B-side. However, it was unsuccessful, not making a dent in the charts.

Reception

Although "Sweet Lady Genevieve" was not successful commercially, it has since been praised by music critics. Hickey claimed it "may be the last truly great Kinks song" and said that he "can think of few braver artistic works." AllMusic's Stephen Thomas Erlewine called the track "absolutely gorgeous" and labelled it the "real candidate for Davies' forgotten masterpiece".  Jason Josephes of Pitchfork Media said that "Sweet Lady Genevieve "is one of the Kinks' greatest singles, a simple porchy folk- rock number you'll be humming for days."  The track has since appeared on the compilation album Picture Book.

References

The Kinks songs
1973 songs
1973 singles
Songs written by Ray Davies
Song recordings produced by Ray Davies
RCA Records singles
Folk rock songs